This is a list of notable naval diving units/frogman corps and may contain combat units, salvage units, training units and diving research units which are present or past commands of any branch of the armed forces of any country.

Algeria

Argentina 

 Tactical Divers Group (Buzos Tácticos) is the special operations unit of the Argentine navy. The operatives are combat divers, EOD/demolition technicians, and parachutists.

Austria 
The Jagdkommando (German for Hunter force) is the Austrian Armed Forces' Special Operations group.

Australia 

Clearance Diving Branch is the specialist diving unit of the Royal Australian Navy whose versatile role covers all spheres of military diving
Special Air Service Regiment is a dedicated special forces unit of the Australian Army that includes undertaking water operations with the emphasis of insertion onto land

Bangladesh 
 
 Para Commando Brigade (Bangladesh) is a unit of the Bangladesh Army which has a frogman commando unit specialized for underwater demolition trained under supervision on Bangladeshi Naval special forces SWADS

Belgium 

 Special Forces Group has a specialized diving company for education and training of combat swimmers.

Brazil 

 Brazilian Navy Frogmen, Combat Divers - (GRUMEC) the brazilian SEALS.
 Brazilian Army Combat Divers, 2 branches: Commandos (D/A unit) & Army Special Forces 
 Brazilian Army Divers - Engineering and Salvage Divers
 Brazilian Marines - Amphibian Commandos (COMANF) 
 Navy Divers - Salvage Divers / Saturation Divers / Non Combatant

Brunei  
 Naval Surface Action Group

Canada 

JTF2

Croatia 

 Croatian Special Operations Battalion (BSD)

Denmark 

 Frogman Corps (Denmark) is an elite special forces frogman corps in the Royal Danish Navy

Eritrea 

 During Eritrea's war of independence against Ethiopia, the rebel forces had a combat frogman force. After the war, some of those frogmen were retrained as dive guides for the scuba diving tourism trade.

Finland 

 The Finnish Navy has trained Finnish combat divers since 1954. Conscripts and career military are eligible to apply for the training. Annually, about 20 conscripts are trained for diving duties. Applying for combat diver training is voluntary, and the selection criteria are stringent. The conscript divers are trained either for anti-mine or for commando operations, while career personnel may also be trained for deep-sea diving duty. All conscript divers receive at least NCO training during their 12-month service period.

France

French Navy 
Commando Hubert, the combat diver unit belonging to Commandos Marine, within FORFUSCO, a section of the French Navy.
Minewseeper divers perform sea and land EOD tasks and engineering diving.

French Army 
Each Engineer regiment do have a platoon, called DINOPS of military diver, tasked with  engineer missions, reconnaissance and specialized actions in underwater inland environnement, including sewage systems. 
Special Forces regiments (1st Marine Infantry Paratroopers Regiment and 13th Paratrooper Dragoons Regiment)and Strategic Reconnaissance Regiment (2nd Hussar Regiment) do have underwater operators platoons.

Directorate-General for External Security 
The French foreign intelligence agency has a clandestine combat swimmer unit, called CPEOM ("Paratrooper Training Centre for Maritime Operations").

Germany 

Kommando Spezialkräfte Marine – Commando amphibious warfare force, called the Kampfschwimmer ("Combat Swimmers", abbreviated "KSM").
Minentaucher Mine clearance divers.

Greece 

 Underwater Demolition Command
 1953: first Amphibious Reconnaissance Squad is founded.
 1957–1968: Underwater Demolition Training School operates in Kannelopoulos training center.
 1968: Underwater Demolition Team Division established in Skaramanga.
 1969: UDT Division renamed to Underwater Demolition Unit.
2002: Underwater Demolition Unit renamed to Underwater Demolition Command.

India 

 MARCOS – The MCF is the elite naval special operations unit of the Indian Navy that undertakes Amphibious reconnaissance, Amphibious warfare, underwater demolition.
Para (Special Forces) - Some commandos of the elite Parachute Regiment (India) special forces of the Indian Army are trained combat divers.
NSG (National security guards) - operatives of Special action group of NSG are from the special forces of the Indian armed forces on deputation, some commandos of the unit are combat diving qualified.

Indonesia 

 KOPASKA is the main underwater combat, Frogman, Special forces unit of the Indonesian Navy.

Ireland 

Naval Service Diving Section (NSDS)
Army Ranger Wing (ARW) Combat Diving Section

Israel 

Shayetet 13 is the elite naval commando frogmen unit of the Israeli Navy. The unit is considered one of the primary Special Forces units of the Israel Defense Forces and is one of the most secretive. The details of many missions and identities of active operatives are highly classified.

Italy 

 Decima Flottiglia MAS
 Italian Commando Frogmen

Japan 

 Western Army Infantry Regiment (WAIR)
 Special Boarding Unit (SBU)

Lebanon 

 Lebanese Navy SEALs Regiment is an elite marine commando frogmen unit of the Lebanese Navy. The unit are responsible for underwater demolition, conducting joint operations with the navy, land and air forces and maritime counter terrorism. The unit was established with assistance from the United States Navy SEALs and British Royal Marines.

Malaysia 

PASKAL – Naval special force of Malaysian Armed Forces.
Naval Diving and Mine Warfare Headquarters – New Command for the elite Royal Malaysian Navy (RMN) divers. The same task once belongs to KD Duyong which now functioning as full-time diving school.
Grup Gerak Khas – Malaysian Army special force, there is Combat Swimmer Course as an advance training option for the members of GGK.
PASKAU - Special force of Malaysian Air Force.
Special Task And Rescue - Special force of Malaysian Coast Guard.

Mexico 

 Fuerzas Especiales

Namibia 

 Namibian Marine Corps Operational Diving Team

Netherlands 

Korps Commandotroepen (KCT), (Riverine Operations Teams (OWG)), special forces of the Royal Netherlands Army. 
Netherlands Maritime Special Operations Forces (NLMARSOF) (Special Forces Underwater Operators), special forces of the Royal Netherlands Marine Corps.
Constructieduikerspeloton is the Army Engineers unit specialized in supporting Rivier Crossing Operations and executing heavy underwater construction operations. They are incorporated in 105 bridging company.
Engineer combat divers of 11 airmobile engineer company. Operations include reconnaissance, demolition, and other.
 Beach Recce Teams of Surface Assault and Training Group of the Royal Netherlands Marine Corps.
 Defensie Duikgroep (Defense Diving Group) of the Royal Netherlands Navy. Organized into the Very-Shallow-Water-Diveteam (Supports amphibious operations of the Royal Netherlands Marine Corps by clearing beaches), the Deep Diving Team (Specializes in deep diving, clearing mines, rescues of crews of submerged submarines), and the Salvage & Construction team (Specializes in subsurface repair of ships, underwater construction, and harbor inspection).
 Explosieven Opruimingsdienst Defensie (EODD) (Explosive Ordnance Disposal Service Defense). All members of the Maritime Company must be Clearance Diver trained before being allowed to serve in the EODD.

New Zealand 

Navy Clearance Diving Group (CDG) formally known as the Operational Diving Team (ODT) is a clearance diving unit. Its focus is on Mine Countermeasures, amphibious Operations & Maritime explosive ordnance disposal. The CDG is ranked as one of the world's top clearance diving units.  Military Dive Training support is supplied to Fiji, Tonga, and Samoa.
The New Zealand Special Air Service also has divers in its amphibious troops (the NZSAS has two Sabre Squadrons), with particular emphasis on insertion.

Norway 

 Norway's commando frogmen corps is called Marinejegerkommandoen, "Navy Seals command", which is something like the British SBS.
 Norway has a clearance diver group called Minedykkerkommandoen, "Norwegian Navy EOD Command".

Pakistan 

 Army Special Service Group (SSG) has a "Moses Company" that is uniquely modeled on the United States Army Special Forces, they mainly operate on inland rivers and waterfield in the five rivers of Punjab, Pakistan. 
 Navy Special Services Group (SSGN) is also uniquely modeled on United States Navy SEALs entirely and is assigned to unconventional warfare operations in the coastal regions. During war, it is assigned to Midget submarines as Diver propulsion vehicle. All other training is similar to the Army SSG with specific marine orientation provided at its headquarters.

Philippines 

 Naval Special Operations Command

Poland 
Three Polish military units train and deploy frogmen in military operations. Most known are:

 JW Formoza
 JW Grom water operations detachment
 JW Komandosów's frogmen company.

Polish frogmen SF uses e.g. R.C.H OXY-NG2, Aqua Lung Amphora closed-circuit apparatus.

Portugal 

 Sappers Divers Group (Agrupamento de Mergulhadores)
 Special Actions Detachment (Destacamento de Ações Especiais)

Romania 
  Battle divers - Naval Group of Special Operations Forces (GNFOS)
  http://www.centruldescafandri.ro/

Russia 

 Russian commando frogmen
 Special Operations Forces
 Diver Units in different SpetsNaz Brigades and Naval Infantry Separate Reconnaissance Battalions.

Serbia

Singapore 

 Naval Diving Unit

Sri Lanka 

 Special Boat Squadron

South Africa 

 Operational Diving Division (SA Navy), based in Simon's Town.
 South African Special Forces.

South Korea (Republic of) 

 Republic of Korea Navy Under Water Demolition Team (UDT)
 Republic of Korea Marine Corps Reconnaissance
 Republic of Korea Army Special Warfare Command (Special forces)

Spain 
Spain has been training combat divers and swimmers since 1967. Two units in the Spanish Navy currently operate under a Naval Special Warfare mandate:

 UOE (Special Operations Unit) – All aspects of maritime special operations at sea, on land, and by air.
 UEBC (Special Combat Diver Unit) – Mainly hydrographic surveys, underwater demolitions and special reconnaissance.

Nowadays both units were unified into the Naval Special Warfare Unit (FGNE) , which covers all maritime special operations such as underwater demolitions, underwater infiltration techniques, maritime interdiction operations, direct action, military assistance, special reconnaissance, hydrographic surveys, parachuting into water (helocast, craftcast...), etc

Sweden 

 Swedish Amphibious Corps: 
The Reconnaissance Platoon, also referred to colloquially as the Attack Divers (A-dyk). They conduct long-range reconnaissance missions behind enemy lines, sabotage, clearing beach obstacles, hydrographic surveys, and although combat is not their priority, they have a limited ability to conduct direct action missions such as ambushes. Between 6 and 10 are trained each year. The Reconnaissance Platoon is a commando unit, belonging to the amphibious battalion of the Swedish Amphibious Corps. They offer one of the hardest and most demanding training regimens in the Swedish armed forces.
Navy EOD-divers (Röjdyk)
Army divers (FArb-dykare) Underwater welding, obstacle clearance, underwater demolition and repairs. Belongs to the engineer troops.
Amphibious divers (Amfibiedyk) of the amphibious battalion. Underwater obstacle clearance, repairs and EOD on land.

Taiwan 

Republic of China Marine Corps Command
Amphibious Reconnaissance and Patrol Unit 
Republic of China Navy 
Underwater Demolition Team (U.D.T) was withdraw from the R.O.C Navy in 2005 and was adapted to the ROC Marines Corps Amphibious Reconnaissance and Patrol Group
Republic of China Army General Headquarters 
Aviation and Special Forces Command 
101st Reconnaissance Battalion (better known as Sea Dragon Frogman, has a company station in Kinmen, Matsu, 3 in Penghu, and other frontline islands)

Thailand 
Royal Thai Armed Forces 
3rd Special Forces Regiment, King's Guard (Airborne)
Royal Thai Navy Diver & EOD
Royal Thai Navy SEALs

Tunisia 

 Special Forces Group (Tunisia) (GFS)
 51st Marine Commando Regiment (51st RCM)

Turkey

Ukraine 

 Ukrainian SOF
 73rd Maritime Special Operations Centre
 Ukrainian Navy
 801st Center for Combat against Underwater Incursion Forces and Devices and Mine Disposal

United Kingdom 

Special Boat Service is the Navy Service special forces unit
Royal Navy Northern and Southern Fleet Diving Groups and Fleet Diving Units 1, 2 and 3 are the clearance diving units specialising in various types of equipment and operations.  
Special Air Service Boat Troop is the Army special forces unit that undertakes water operations (emphasis of insertion onto land)
 Royal Engineers: the corps has had army divers for over 170 years. Training was held at Marchwood in Hampshire until moving to HMS Gunwharf in Portsmouth in the early 1980s. Now a combination of Royal Engineers and Royal Navy all train at a special diving school at Horsea Island in Hampshire. The roles of the Royal Engineer Divers are probably the most diverse of all including construction, demolition, reconnaissance, search, recovery and sewer searches. Unlike naval divers who dive both mixed  gas sets and air sets, RE divers only specialise in Air diving.
Royal logistic Corps Divers as part of 17  Port and Maritime Regiment

United States

See also

References 

Armed forces diving
Diving